Tigrioides alterna is a moth of the family Erebidae first described by Francis Walker in 1854. It is found in Australia.

References

Lithosiina
Moths described in 1854